|}
This is a list of Legislative Assembly results for the 2016 Australian Capital Territory general election.

Results by electorate

Brindabella

Ginninderra

Kurrajong

Murrumbidgee

Yerrabi

See also
Members of the Australian Capital Territory Legislative Assembly, 2016–2020
 List of Australian Capital Territory elections

References

2020